Fátima Alexandra Figueira Pinto (born 16 January 1996) is a Portuguese professional footballer who plays as a midfielder for Spanish club Deportivo Alavés and the Portugal women's national team.

Career

Club
Pinto started to play football at the age of seven in amateur boy's teams. In 2011, at the age of 13, she started her career at the Grupo Desportivo APEL's women's team, a club from her native city, Funchal. In 2013, she signed with first division team Atlético Ouriense. With the club, Pinto was crowned the league's champions in the 2013/2014 season, becoming the first female player from the Madeira island to do so. In the following season, she headed to Spain and signed with Primera División club, Santa Teresa CD. After two seasons, Pinto returned to Portugal to play for Sporting CP. With the club she was again crowned as a league champion in the 2016/2017 season. On 19 March 2018 Pinto was included by the "Quinas de Ouro" award among the "11 Best Players" in the Portuguese women's league. The award is annually organized by the Portuguese Football Federation together with the "Associação Nacional dos Treinadores de Futebol" and the "Sindicato dos Jogadores Profissionais de Futebol".

International
Pinto started to play for Portugal's Under-19 team in 2012. On 2 July 2012 she debuted for the U19 team in a match against Turkey U19, valid for the 2012 UEFA Women's Under-19 Championship. A championship in which Portugal reached the semi-finals for the first time in history. Pinto also represented Portugal at the 2013 UEFA Women's Under-19 Championship Qualifying Stages and the 2015 UEFA Women's Under-19 Championship Qualifying Stage. On 9 April 2015, again against Turkey U19, she played her last match for the Portugal U19 team, totalling 25 matches played and four goals scored for the team.

On 26 October 2013, in a defeat against Netherlands for the 2015 FIFA Women's World Cup qualification stage, Pinto debuted for the Portuguese senior team. On 6 July 2017 Pinto was called by coach Francisco Neto to represent Portugal at the UEFA Women's Euro 2017, becoming the first player from Madeira to ever represent Portugal in a UEFA Women's Championship.

International goals

References

External links
 
 
 
 

1996 births
Living people
Fátima Pinto
Fátima Pinto
Women's association football midfielders
Santa Teresa CD players
Expatriate women's footballers in Spain
Portuguese expatriate sportspeople in Spain
Sportspeople from Funchal
Primera División (women) players
Sporting CP (women's football) players
Madeiran footballers
Atlético Ouriense players
UEFA Women's Euro 2022 players
UEFA Women's Euro 2017 players
Portuguese expatriate women's footballers